Castelnuovo Rangone is a comune (municipality) in the Province of Modena in the Italian region Emilia-Romagna, located about  west of Bologna and about  south of Modena. The most important economic activity is the production and treatment of pork.
 
Castelnuovo Rangone borders the following municipalities: Castelvetro di Modena, Formigine, Modena, Spilamberto.

Twin towns
Castelnuovo Rangone is twinned with:

  Suhr, Switzerland
  Auriol, France

References

External links
 Official website

Cities and towns in Emilia-Romagna